Icarus Nestor Pappas (April 16, 1933 – August 31, 2008), better known as Ike Pappas, was an American television journalist who worked as a CBS News correspondent for 25 years.

Life and career
Pappas was born in the Flushing, Queens, section of New York City. He graduated from Long Island University and then spent two years in the United States Army. He was assigned to Stars and Stripes during his enlistment.

Dallas, Texas, November 24, 1963
That morning, Pappas was among the throng of reporters present at the Dallas City Jail for presidential assassin Lee Harvey Oswald's transfer to the County Jail. Working for WNEW-AM in New York at the time, Pappas began his report as Oswald came into view:

As Pappas asked Oswald the question, Jack Ruby stepped out of the crowd of reporters with a pistol, moved in front of Oswald and fired one shot into Oswald's abdomen.

Pappas later testified in Ruby's trial.

Later years
In May 1970, Pappas was at Kent State University with a CBS News film crew when members of the Ohio National Guard shot four students during an antiwar protest.

Pappas was the most prominent of 215 people laid off in 1987 during a downsizing at CBS News.

Along with a number of other notable Greek Americans, he was a founding member of The Next Generation Initiative, a leadership program aimed at getting students involved in public affairs.

After he left CBS, Pappas formed his own television production company with CBS News Editor Ed Danko, and made cameo appearances as himself in several motion pictures, including The Package and Moon Over Parador.

A resident of McLean, Virginia, in his later years, he died in Arlington, Virginia, of congestive heart failure, aged 75.

References

External links

1933 births
2008 deaths
American television journalists
American war correspondents
American war correspondents of the Vietnam War
American male journalists
American people of Greek descent
People from Queens, New York
20th-century American journalists
Journalists from New York City